Marchlands is a British television series developed from the American television drama pilot The Oaks, written and created by David Schulner, broadcast on ITV1 in 2011. A follow-up series, Lightfields, was broadcast in 2013. Each five-episode series explores the lives of three families, occupying the same house in different time periods. The house is haunted by a restless spirit, and the previous house owners appear to their successors as ghosts as well.

Marchlands

Marchlands was first shown on ITV on 3 February 2011. It follows a story of three different families living in the same house in Yorkshire in three different time periods - 1968, 1987 and 2010. The three families are linked by the spirit of a young girl who died under mysterious circumstances in 1967.

Plot
In 1968, Ruth and Paul Bowen live in Marchlands with Paul's parents Robert and Evelyn. Six months earlier, Ruth and Paul's daughter Alice died, apparently in an accidental drowning, and Ruth is determined to find out the truth about what happened to her, believing there is more to Alice's death than she is being led to believe.

In 1987, Helen and Eddie Maynard rent Marchlands and live with their two children. They discover their daughter Amy has what seems to be an imaginary friend called Alice, which they initially try to ignore. After a series of suspiciously paranormal activities, matters become more serious when Amy blames Alice for the death of a kitten, leading to her parents sending Amy for medical tests.

In 2010, Mark Ashburn and his pregnant partner Nisha Parekh move into Marchlands and find a photo of a young girl, who the viewers now know to be Alice. Nisha becomes suspicious that Mark has not told her the whole truth about why they have moved there. An elderly Ruth, who never came to terms with the death of her child and remains determined to find out what happened, returns to Marchlands when Mark employs her as a housekeeper and childminder after Nisha breaks her ankle when falling from a step-ladder.

Production
The series was filmed on location in and around London, as well as on the Ashridge Estate, the village of Aldbury, and the surrounding village of Little Gaddesden. The house in which the main part of the story was filmed is in Tadworth, Surrey. Marchlands marks the first commission to come from the creative collaboration between ITV & Twentieth Century Fox. The Oaks writer David Schulner was heavily involved in the series' commission.

Characters

1968
Ruth Bowen (Jodie Whittaker). Grieving for her eight-year-old daughter Alice who drowned six months previously, she senses she has been misled on the cause of Alice's death.
Robert Bowen (Denis Lawson). Local mill owner Robert, the grandfather of Alice. As Alice was in his care when she died, he was the last to see Alice; his daughter-in-law questions him a lot about how she died and that is extremely difficult for him.
Evelyn Bowen (Tessa Peake-Jones). Married to Robert and living with her son Paul and daughter-in-law Ruth, Evelyn appears to be the most pragmatic member of the family. Wanting to move on from the loss of Alice, she believes her daughter-in-law's continual questions aren't helpful. Although Evelyn isn't fully aware of the cause of Alice's death, she has her own secrets.
Paul Bowen (Jamie Thomas King). Paul is the accounts manager at the local mill, owned by his father Robert. He finds his marriage to Ruth under pressure as they both struggle to cope with their grief in different ways.
 Liz Runcie (Jennifer Hennessy). Mother of Olive and lives next door to Marchlands, she is also friends with Ruth.
Alice Bowen (Millie Archer). Alice died in mysterious circumstances in November 1967. She has a spiritual presence in Marchlands many years after her death.

1987
Helen Maynard (Alex Kingston). Housewife Helen Maynard rents Marchlands with her husband Eddie, a supervisor in a saw mill. They live with their two children, Scott and Amy. When daughter Amy claims to be communicating with the spirit of a young girl, Helen sends her for psychiatric tests rather than believe her story.
Eddie Maynard (Dean Andrews). Eddie works as the supervisor at the local saw mill. He is more sympathetic towards Amy's claims that she is communicating with a spirit and is prepared to listen to anything she says. Eddie is reluctant to send Amy for medical tests but agrees to it to keep the peace.
Scott Maynard (Ethan Griffin). Son of Helen and Eddie, he believes sister Amy is seeking attention by claiming to be communicating with the dead. He shows no sympathy towards Amy, preferring to taunt and ridicule her about her story.
Amy Maynard (Sydney Wade). Daughter of Helen and Eddie, she claims to be communicating with the spirit of a dead girl, Alice. Her family prefer to believe she may have a medical condition rather than believe she is communicating with the dead.
Mark Ashburn (Ryan Prescott). Mark works in Olive's garden and he falls in love with her and is friends with Scott.
 Olive Runcie (Sophie Stone). She lives next door to Marchlands with her mother, Liz. She has a crush on Mark.
 Older Liz Runcie (Jennifer Hennessy). Mother of Olive and lives next door to Marchlands.

2010
Nisha Parekh (Shelley Conn). Nisha is pregnant when she moves to Marchlands to live in the village where her fiancé Mark grew up. Nisha begins to feel the presence of a little girl who used to live in the house. Initially comforted by the connection to the past, she gradually begins to feel lonely, isolated from Mark and the spookiness of the house becomes unnerving, especially when the baby is born.
Older Mark Ashburn (Elliot Cowan). Mark returns to his former village after several years away. Mark was persuaded to return to his home village by partner Nisha, as she feels it will be the perfect place to raise a child.
Older Ruth Bowen (Anne Reid). Ruth returns to Marchlands in 2010 when she is employed as a housekeeper by Mark, after Nisha has a setback when falling from a step ladder. Many years after the death of her daughter Alice, Ruth is still as determined as ever to find out the truth about what really happened to her.
 Older Olive Runcie (Elizabeth Rider). Olive is Mark's young love who has lived next door to Marchlands for her whole life. She is keeping a secret but what is it?
Older Scott Maynard (Daniel Casey). The corner shop owner. Scott is reluctant to talk about the events that happened to his family when he lived in Marchlands and Nisha often goes to the corner shop and asks about what Mark was like when he lived in the village, but he is reluctant to say.

Episodes

Lightfields

Lightfields was first shown on ITV on 27 February 2013. It follows a story of three different families living in the same house in Suffolk during three different time periods - 1944, 1975 and 2012. The three families are linked by the spirit of a young girl who died under mysterious circumstances in 1944.

Plot
In 1944, Eve (Dakota Blue Richards), an evacuee from London, arrives at Lightfields with her little sister Vivien (Leilah de Meza) and is sent to help out on the farm, owned by Albert (Sam Hazeldine) and Martha Felwood (Jill Halfpenny). She befriends Albert and Martha's daughter, Lucy (Antonia Clarke), who is later tragically killed in a fire at the barn after locking horns with Eve over the heart of dashing American Dwight (Neil Jackson). The rest of this time period shows Lucy's family grieving for their dead daughter and Eve's determination to find out what really happened to her.

In 1975, Vivien (Lucy Cohu) returns to Lightfields years later along with her daughter Clare (Karla Crome), in the summer of 1975 to stay at the house for six weeks, while Vivien is trying to take some time away to deal with her failing marriage. Shortly after they arrive, they notice some unusual activity happening on the property, and Vivien starts to remember through flashbacks the time she spent there in 1944 as an evacuee (Leilah de Meza) as she had blocked that period of time from her mind.

In 2012, Lightfields, now an up and running bed & breakfast, run by Lucy's nephew, Barry (Danny Webb). When Lucy's brother, Pip (Michael Byrne), returns to Lightfields, and strange things start happening, he believes that they are being haunted by Lucy's restless spirit. As these hauntings continue, Barry's wayward son-in-law Paul (Kris Marshall) uses the situation to his advantage as he tries to gain custody of his son Luke (Alexander Aze), who is being looked after by Barry and his wife Lorna (Sophie Thompson).

Production
In August 2012, ITV ordered a five-part follow-up to Marchlands after promising ratings. The cast for this series was announced to include Jill Halfpenny, Sam Hazeldine, Dakota Blue Richards, Lucy Cohu, Karla Crome, Danny Webb, Kris Marshall and Sophie Thompson. Simon Tyrell was later confirmed as the main scriptwriter for this series.

Characters

1944
 Lucy Felwood (Antonia Clarke). In 1944, Lucy - the daughter of Martha and Albert Felwood - dies in a barn fire. The police say it was a tragic accident but others are not so sure.
 Eve Traverse (Dakota Blue Richards). Eve arrives to help on Lightfields Farm and befriends Lucy prior to the tragedy.  After Lucy's death, Eve is determined to find the truth.
 Vivien Traverse (Leilah de Meza). Vivien is the little sister of Eve who knows something about Lucy's death. No one knows her secret, the shock of which causes the memory to be locked away for years.
 Martha Felwood (Jill Halfpenny). Martha is the mother of Lucy who is grieving over her death.
 Albert Felwood (Sam Hazeldine). Albert is the father of Lucy who also knows something of what happened that horrific night.
 Dwight Lawson (Neil Jackson). Dwight is an American airman who had a liaison with Lucy on the night of the tragedy.  A piece of evidence could tie him to the fire.
 Tom (Danny Miller). Tom works on Lightfields farm and has an unrequited crush on Lucy.
 Harry Dunn (Luke Newberry). Harry lives in the village and also has something of a crush on Lucy.  He befriends Eve to find out what happened.
 Pip Felwood (Larry Mills). Pip is the younger brother to Lucy.

1975
 Older Vivien Mullen (née Traverse) (Lucy Cohu). The older Vivien visits Lightfields three decades later: however, her staying at Lightfields again starts to trigger memories of the awful summer of 1944.
 Clare Mullen (Karla Crome). Clare is the daughter to Vivien who joins her mother on the trip, where she begins a relationship with Nick.
 Older Tom (Wayne Foskett). The older Tom still lives in the village.  He gets to know Vivien and Clare by carrying out repairs at Lightfields for their stay.  However, could he be holding a secret memory of the fire of 1944?
 Nick (Chris Mason). Nick is the young local who has a holiday romance with Clare.

2012
 Older Pip Felwood (Michael Byrne). The elderly Pip returns to stay at Lightfields after an operation, but his return sparks a childhood memory from 1944.
 Barry Felwood (Danny Webb). Barry is Pip's son, who now runs Lightfields as a B&B.
 Lorna Felwood (Sophie Thompson). Lorna is married to Barry and helps him manage the B&B.
 Luke Fenner (Alexander Aze). Luke is Barry and Lorna's young grandson who - since the death of his mother - stays with them at Lightfields.
 Paul Fenner (Kris Marshall). Paul was married to Barry and Lorna's deceased daughter Trisha.  His main obsessions are drinking and trying to gain custody of Luke.
 Older Vivien Mullen (née Traverse) (Lynn Farleigh). The older Vivien returns to Lightfields to help solve the mystery of the tragedy almost seventy years previously.

Episodes

References

External links

 

2010s British drama television series
2011 British television series debuts
2013 British television series endings
2010s British television miniseries
British supernatural television shows
English-language television shows
British fantasy television series
ITV television dramas
Television series by 20th Century Fox Television
Television series by ITV Studios
Television series set in the 1960s
Television series set in the 1980s
Television shows set in Yorkshire
Films set in 1944
Films set in 1975
Films set in 2012
Television shows set in Suffolk